The 2018 San Jose mayoral election was held on June 5, 2018 to elect the Mayor of San Jose, California. Since incumbent mayor Sam Liccardo received over 50% of the vote in the primary election there was no need for a run-off election in November. 

Municipal elections in California are officially non-partisan.

Results

Notes

References

San Jose
San Jose
2018